Vid is a village in Dubrovnik-Neretva County, Croatia, administered as a part of the city of Metković, population 796 (census 2011). It is famous for the ruins of the Roman city of Narona. It has a museum of Roman history in the region, called Archeological Museum of Narona.

References

External links

  The official portal of Vid in Croatia
 Archeological Museum of Narona -Vid Croatia

Populated places in Dubrovnik-Neretva County